The Mohave tui chub (Siphateles bicolor mohavensis) is a species of fish. It is an endangered chub originally found only in the Mojave River.  Even though named after the Mojave River, the fish's name is normally spelled "Mohave".  It was named by ichthyologist Robert Rush Miller.

In their original Mojave River habitat, the Mohave chub have hybridized with the coastal chub (Gila orcutti); because of this, the Mojave Chub Spring is now the main source for all genetically "pure" Mohave chubs.  Other locations in California have been used as refuges for this pure variety by intentionally introducing the fish into the location.

See also
Lake Tuendae
Zzyzx, California

References

External links
 Lewis Center Tui Chub Home has a large amount of information about the Mohave tui chub, including pictures.
 U.S. Fish and Wildlife Service Threatened and Endangered Species System entry
 Mojave National Preserve Animals Short history of the Mohave Tui Chub since the 1930s.

Tui Mohave
Endemic fauna of California
Mohave tui chub
Fish of the Western United States
Freshwater fish of the United States
Mohave tui chub
Mohave tui chub
Siphateles
Fish described in 1918